John A. Mercer (born January 21, 1957) is an American politician and attorney in the state of Montana. He served in the Montana House of Representatives from 1984 to 2000. From 1993 to 1999 he served four terms as Speaker of the House, and in 1993 served as minority leader. He is the longest serving Speaker of the House of Montana in state history. After serving as chairman of the Montana Board of Regents, Mercer ended a considerable career in public service.

John Mercer is a recipient of the State Bar of Montana Distinguished Service Award and Community Service Award of the University of Montana.

From 1982 he has practiced law at Turnage Mercer & Wall PLLP; the firm founded by Montana Supreme Court Justice Jean Turnage. He attended the University of Montana and Northwestern University, earning his JD degree at the latter. He is admitted to practice before the Montana Supreme Court, Federal District Court of Montana, United States Circuit Court of Appeals (9th Circuit) and the Supreme Court of the United States.

References

Politicians from Missoula, Montana
1957 births
Living people
Republican Party members of the Montana House of Representatives
Speakers of the Montana House of Representatives
People from Polson, Montana